Breaking is a 2022 American thriller drama film starring John Boyega as a Marine Corps veteran, Brian Brown-Easley, who is in financial trouble and robs a bank. It is written and directed by Abi Damaris Corbin and co-written by Kwame Kwei-Armah, based on the true story of Brown-Easley, detailed in the 2018 Task & Purpose article "They Didn't Have to Kill Him" by Aaron Gell. The film also stars Nicole Beharie, Selenis Leyva, Connie Britton, Jeffrey Donovan, and Michael Kenneth Williams.

The film premiered at the 2022 Sundance Film Festival under its original title 892 on January 21, 2022, and was released in the United States by Bleecker Street on August 26, 2022. It received generally positive reviews from critics.

Plot
Based on the 2017 real-life story of the late Brian Brown-Easley, a decorated Marine Corps veteran in dire financial straits resulting from systemic failure. Easley is concerned over the effects of this on his daughter alongside the prospects of homelessness to the point of threatening to blow up a Wells Fargo bank unless he receives payment he is owed from the Department of Veterans Affairs.

Cast
 John Boyega as Lance Corporal Brian Brown-Easley
 Michael Kenneth Williams as Eli Bernard
 Nicole Beharie as Estel Valerie
 Selenis Leyva as Rosa Diaz
 Connie Britton as Lisa Larson
 Jeffrey Donovan as Major Riddick
 Robb Derringer as Chief Jack Quail
 Olivia Washington as Cassandra Easley
 London Covington as Kiah Brown-Easley
 Kim D'Armond as 911 Wendy

Production
On March 2, 2021, it was announced that Jonathan Majors would star in the film, then titled 892, as a Marine war veteran who suffers from mental scars, and his hard transition back to civilian life. The screenplay was based on Aaron Gell's article "They Didn't Have to Kill Him", published on Task & Purpose on April 9, 2018. On July 8, 2021, it was reported that John Boyega replaced Majors due to a scheduling conflict with Ant-Man and the Wasp: Quantumania. On August 30, 2021, it was confirmed that Connie Britton joined the cast.

Principal photography began on July 6, 2021, and was scheduled to conclude on August 16, 2021, in Los Angeles.

Release
The film premiered at the 2022 Sundance Film Festival on January 21, 2022, where the cast won the Special Jury Award for Ensemble Cast in the U.S. Dramatic Competition. On February 1, 2022, Bleecker Street acquired the film's US distribution rights. The film's title was later changed from 892 to Breaking, and it was set to be released on August 26, 2022.

Reception

Box office 
In the United States and Canada, Breaking was released alongside The Invitation and Three Thousand Years of Longing. The film debuted to $985,921 from 902 theaters in its opening weekend.

Critical response 
 

Pete Hammond of Deadline Hollywood said, "Corbin is firmly in control behind the camera and with particular expert help with her editor Chris Witt. The British actor Boyega is superb in every aspect of the role, as is the commanding presence of the late Williams in what sadly is his final film role."

Writing for Variety, Peter Debruge said, "This is not an act of documentary reenactment so much as a tense, speculative drama, imagining what this man must have gone through during those hours, and how his actions rippled out to affect others' lives."

Accolades
2022 Sundance Film Festival: Special Jury Award for Ensemble Cast in the U.S. Dramatic Competition.

References

External links
 
 

2022 thriller drama films
2020s American films
2020s English-language films
African-American drama films
American films based on actual events
American thriller drama films
Bleecker Street films
Drama films based on actual events
Films about bank robbery
Films about hostage takings
Films about post-traumatic stress disorder
Films about veterans
Films based on Internet-based works
Films scored by Michael Abels
Films set in 2017
Films set in Georgia (U.S. state)
Films shot in Los Angeles
Sundance Film Festival award winners
Thriller films based on actual events